Louis Chavance (1907–1979) was a French screenwriter. He also worked occasionally as a film editor and assistant director. He is best known for his screenplay for Le Corbeau which he first wrote in 1933 although the film was not made for another decade.

Selected filmography

Screenwriter
 The Trump Card (1942)
 La Nuit fantastique (1942)
 The Phantom Baron (1943)
 Le Corbeau (1943)
 A Lover's Return (1946)
 The Last Penny (1946)
 The Unknown Singer (1947)
 Under the Cards (1948)
 Summer Storm (1949)
 The Man Who Returns from Afar (1950)
 The 13th Letter (1951)
 Tom Toms of Mayumba (1955)

Editor
 L'Atalante (1934)

References

Bibliography
 Matthew Bernstein & Gaylyn Studlar. Visions of the East: Orientalism in Film. Rutgers University Press, 1997.

External links

1907 births
1979 deaths
French male screenwriters
20th-century French screenwriters
Film people from Paris
20th-century French male writers